The T17/18 Beijing-Mudanjiang Through Train (Chinese:T17/18次北京到牡丹江特快速列车) is a railway running between Beijing to Mudanjiang. It carries express passenger trains by the Harbin Railway Bureau, Mudanjiang passenger segment responsible for passenger transport task, Mudanjiang originating on the Beijing train. 25K Passenger trains running along the Jingha Railway and Binsui Railway cross Heilongjiang, Jilin, Liaoning, Hebei, Tianjin, Beijing and other areas, covering 1552 km. Beijing railway station to Mudanjiang railway station require 16 hours and 50 minutes, while Mudanjiang railway station to Beijing railway station requires 17 hours and 36 minutes.

Carriages

Locomotives

Timetable

See also 
T297/298 Beijing-Mudanjiang Through Train

References 

Passenger rail transport in China
Rail transport in Beijing
Rail transport in Heilongjiang